Weekend Radio is a radio variety show hosted by Robert Conrad; its flagship station is WCLV in Cleveland, Ohio. The program offers a mixture of light classical music with audio essays and comedy recordings.

Weekend Radio is syndicated and runs for an hour on many National Public Radio-affiliated stations throughout the United States.

The opening and closing theme music is the last movement ("Le Bal") of Georges Bizet's Jeux d'enfants (Bizet) as arranged for woodwind quintet by Gordon Davies. 

In the 1980s, the closing credit music was "Fugacity" by Mr. and Mrs. Garvey.

External links
Official site 
American variety radio programs
Radio in Cleveland